This article contains information about the literary events and publications of 1549.

Events
June 9 – The Booke of the Common Prayer is introduced in churches in England as required by the Act of Uniformity of January 15. It results in a Prayer Book Rebellion breaking out in the West Country.
Sir Donald Monro, Dean of the Isles, produces the original manuscript of the Description of the Western Isles of Scotland (not published until 1582).
unknown date – The content of the Guildhall Library in the City of London is acquired by Edward Seymour, 1st Duke of Somerset, Lord Protector of England, for his personal use.

New books

Prose
Joachim du Bellay – La Deffense et illustration de la langue françoyse
Joannes Bunderius – Compendium concertationis hujus saeculi sapientium et theologorum
Robert Wedderburn (probable) – The Complaynt of Scotland

Drama
Johannes Aal – Johannes der Täufer (John the Baptist)
Lodovico Dolce
Fabritia
Giocasta (translation and adaptation of Euripides' The Phoenician Women)

Poetry
See 1549 in poetry

Births
March 11 – Hendrik Laurenszoon Spiegel, Dutch philosopher and grammarian (died 1612)
December 24 – Kaspar Ulenberg, theologian and Bible translator (died 1617)
unknown dates
Pietro Alagona, Italian theologian (died 1624)
Nikola Vitov Gučetić, Croatian statesman, philosopher and science writer (died 1610)
Antonio de Herrera y Tordesillas, Spanish historian (died 1626)
Thomas Stephens, Jesuit writer and linguist (died 1619)

Deaths
January 23 – Johannes Honter, Romanian humanist theologian (born 1498)
January 28 – Elia Levita, Hebrew grammarian, scholar and poet (born 1469)
March 25 – Veit Dietrich, German theologian (born 1506)
April – Andrew Boorde, traveller, physician and writer (born 1490)
August – Jacob Ziegler, humanist and theologian (born c.1470)
November 25 – Jean de Gagny, French theologian
December 21 – Marguerite de Navarre, French princess, poet, playwright and short story writer (born 1492)
unknown date – Daniel Bomberg, Flemish printer (born c.1483)
probable – Leonard Cox, humanist scholar and rhetorician (born c. 1495)

References

1549 books
Years of the 16th century in literature